Jason Cloke (born 6 May 1982) is an Australian rules footballer, who played in the Australian Football League with the Collingwood Football Club.

Career 
Cloke played his junior football for Park Orchards in the Eastern Junior Football League, and played TAC Cup football for the Eastern Ranges. Both clubs were interested, but it was Collingwood who recruited Cloke with a second-round draft pick in the 2000 AFL Draft (#19 overall). Jason's younger brothers, Cameron and Travis, would also be drafted by Collingwood under the father-son rule in the following years.

He made his senior AFL debut in Round 2, 2002, against the West Coast Eagles at the MCG. He swiftly made a name for himself, earning an AFL Rising Star nomination in his fifth match (Round 6 against St Kilda at Colonial Stadium), and playing a damaging role as a loose man in defence throughout the season.

After playing every match for the 2002 season after Round 2, Cloke received a two-match suspension in the club's preliminary final victory against , for striking Tyson Edwards in a marking contest. Collingwood appealed the decision, but the appeal was rejected, and Cloke missed the Grand Final loss against .

In 2003, Cloke played 20 games, including the Grand Final, but was also demoted to the VFL twice during the season. He played three more seasons for Collingwood, and was delisted at the end of 2006, after a total of 76 games for the club.

In 2007, Cloke played for Bendigo in the Victorian Football League, finishing second in the club's best and fairest award. In 2008, he shifted to Williamstown. (Cloke had previously played for Williamstown when Collingwood was its AFL-affiliate, although by 2008 this affiliation had ended). He played two seasons for Williamstown, then returned to Bendigo in 2010. From 2011 until 2014 he played for Spotswood in the Western Region Football League, where he served as a playing assistant coach, and was part of the Woodsmen's 2011 premiership team. He shifted to Craigieburn in the Essendon District Football League in 2015.
Cloke recently signed with EDFL team Jacana for the 2018 season.

Family 
His uncle (David's brother), Peter, also played 28 games for Richmond from 1970 and was second in the South Australian National Football League's Magarey Medal in 1979.

References

External links 
Jason Cloke at the Collingwood Football Club website

1982 births
Australian rules footballers from Victoria (Australia)
Collingwood Football Club players
Williamstown Football Club players
Bendigo Football Club players
Eastern Ranges players
Spotswood Football Club players
Living people